Wild Cherry was an American funk rock band formed in Mingo Junction, Ohio, in 1970 that was best known for its song "Play That Funky Music".

History

Early lineups (1970–1974)
Rob Parissi (lead vocals and guitar) was raised in the steel-mill town of Mingo Junction, Ohio. He graduated from Mingo High School in 1968 and formed the band Wild Cherry in 1970 in Steubenville, Ohio. The band's name, 'Wild Cherry', was taken from a box of cough drops. The band played the Ohio Valley region, the Northern West Virginia panhandle, and Pittsburgh, Pennsylvania. The original lineup included Ben Difabbio (drums and vocals) and Louie Osso (guitar and vocals) from Steubenville, Larry Brown (bass and vocals) from Weirton, West Virginia, Larry Mader (keyboard and vocals) from East Springfield, Ohio, and Ron Vallera (guitar and background vocals) from Steubenville, Ohio). Over time, the band members changed; Osso, Brown, Mader, and Vallera left the band and were replaced by Parissi's cousin, Coogie Stoddart (guitar and vocals), and Joe Buchmelter (bass). Buchmelter was soon replaced by Bucky Lusk.

In the early 1970s, several records were released under their own label, including "You Can Be High (But Lay Low)" and "Something Special On Your Mind", in 1971. The music at this stage was pure rock music. Wild Cherry eventually gained a record contract with Brown Bag Records, owned and operated by the Terry Knight. Brown Bag produced several demos and singles that were later distributed by United Artists, including "Get Down" (1973) and "Show Me Your Badge" (1973).

The band broke up, and Parissi left the music scene temporarily. He reformed the band in 1975.

Later lineups (1975–1979)
The new lineup consisted of Bryan Bassett (guitar/vocals), Allen Wentz (bass guitar/synthesizer/vocals), Ronald Beitle (drums), and Parissi. As the group began to develop a following in the Pittsburgh area, disco was becoming increasingly popular, and they were repeatedly asked by listeners to play more dance music. While brainstorming for new song ideas, Beitle recounted hearing a fan shout, "Are you white boys gonna play some funky music?" Parissi was inspired to write a song based on the phrase, so he began writing on a drink order pad with a pen borrowed from the bartender. After the band recorded the song, studio engineer Ken Hamann brought the band to the attention of Sweet City Records, distributed by Epic/CBS, which signed the group. Parissi had intended to record the song as the B-side to a cover version of the Commodores' "I Feel Sanctified", but the label suggested it as the A-side instead.

"Play That Funky Music" became a huge hit when released in 1976, peaking at number one on both the  Billboard R&B and pop charts. Both the single and Wild Cherry's self-titled debut album went platinum. The band was named Best Pop Group of the Year by Billboard and received an American Music Award for Top R&B Single of the Year as well as a pair of Grammy nominations for Best New Vocal Group and Best R&B Performance by a Group or Duo.

"Play That Funky Music" was the only hit on the album, although "Hot to Trot" was a minor follow-up hit in some non-U.S. markets. The album featured contributions from keyboardist Mark Avsec, who soon thereafter became a permanent member of the band. None of Wild Cherry's three subsequent albums were very popular. Neither Electrified Funk (1977) (which contained the "Play That Funky Music" soundalike single "Baby Don't You Know") nor I Love My Music (1978) produced any top 40 hits, and Only the Wild Survive (1979) did not even produce a top 100 single. The band broke up in late 1979.

Coogie Stoddart returned to perform with Wild Cherry, beginning with the tour to support Electrified Funk, and recorded I Love My Music with the band. Stoddart toured with the group, in support of I Love My Music but left before Only the Wild Survive was recorded.

Post-breakup (1980–present)
Mark Avsec partnered with Donnie Iris (of the Jaggerz) in the early 1980s to form Donnie Iris and the Cruisers. Iris had played with Wild Cherry on their fourth and final album. Their hit singles included "Ah! Leah!" Avsec also teamed up with fellow Cruiser Kevin Valentine to record under the moniker Cellarful of Noise in 1985, releasing two albums with this project. Another of Avsec's compositions, "She Don't Know Me", originally written for the band La Flavour (who later evolved into "Fair Warning"), became one of the first hits for the then-fledgling band Bon Jovi. A lawsuit related to "Ah! Leah!" inspired Avsec to become a copyright lawyer.

Allen Wentz moved to New York City and became a session synthesizer specialist, playing on many records and jingles. He has worked with artists ranging from Luther Vandross and Roberta Flack to Cyndi Lauper.

Bryan Bassett became a producer and engineer at King Snake Studio in Sanford, Florida. He has played with Foghat and Molly Hatchet, and he has also served as a board governor for the Florida Chapter of NARAS.

Parissi moved to Miami, Florida in 1979 and formed a tour band with Bobby Caldwell. In 1980, Parissi moved to New York City, met members of Billy Squier's band, and did recording sessions with them. At the same time, he also co-wrote songs with Ellie Greenwich and Jeff Kent and co-produced the album Dedication, along with Gary U.S. Bonds and Bruce Springsteen in 1980-81. The album produced the hit "This Little Girl (Is Mine)", which sold over 500,000 copies, for which Rob was awarded another gold album. As of the 2010s, Parissi resides in Florida and is writing and recording in the adult contemporary and smooth jazz genres, as in his CD "The Real Deal", an all-vocal album.

 On August 11, 2013, the people of Parissi's hometown in Mingo Junction, Ohio renamed the longest street there as Rob Parissi Boulevard  and declared August 11 as Rob Parissi Day. He and his wife, Ilona, established a scholarship endowment for his former consolidated high school, now named Indian Creek High School, and he returns every year to do a charity fundraiser.

Ron Beitle (1954–2017) performed with several rock bands, including Nied's Hotel Band in Lawrenceville, Pennsylvania. He died in 2017.

Band members

Final lineup 
Rob Parissi – vocals, guitar (1970–1979)
Donnie Iris – guitar, vocals (1978–1979)
Cooke Michalchick – bass, vocals (1978–1979)
Ronald Beitle – drums, percussion (1975–1979)
Mark Avsec – keyboards (1975–1979)

Previous members 
Ben Difabbio – drums, vocals (1970–1975)
Louie Osso – guitar, vocals (1970–1973)
Larry Brown – bass, vocals (1970–1973)

Coogie Stoddart – guitar, vocals (1973–1975, 1977–78)
Joe Buchmelter – bass (1973)
Bucky Lusk – bass (1973–1975)
Allen Wentz – bass, synthesizer, vocals (1975–1978)
Bryan Bassett – guitar (1975–1978)

Timeline

Discography

Studio albums

Compilation albums
 Play the Funk (2000)
 Super Hits (2002)

Singles

See also
List of artists who reached number one in the United States
List of artists who reached number one on the Billboard R&B chart
List of blue-eyed soul artists
List of funk rock bands
List of 1970s one-hit wonders in the United States

References

Notes

Sources

External links
[ Allmusic Entry]

American funk musical groups
Funk rock musical groups
Rock music groups from Ohio
Musical groups from Pittsburgh
Epic Records artists
American soul musical groups
Musical groups from Ohio
People from Mingo Junction, Ohio
Musical groups established in 1970
Musical groups disestablished in 1979